Ordoliberalism is the German variant of economic liberalism that emphasizes the need for government to ensure that the free market produces results close to its theoretical potential but does not advocate for a welfare state.

Ordoliberal ideals became the foundation of the creation of the post-World War II German social market economy and its attendant . The term "ordoliberalism" was coined in 1950 by Hero Moeller, and refers to the academic journal ORDO.

Linguistic differentiation 

Ordoliberals separate themselves from classical liberals.

Ordoliberals promoted the concept of the social market economy, and this concept promotes a strong role for the state with respect to the market, which is in many ways different from the ideas connected to the term neoliberalism.

Because of the connected history, ordoliberalism is also sometimes referred to as "German neoliberalism". This led to frequent confusion and "mix ups" of terms and ideas in the discourse, debate and criticism of both economic schools of liberalism until in 1991 the political economists  with Capitalisme Contre Capitalisme and in 2001 Peter A. Hall and David Soskice with Varieties of Capitalism aimed to separate the concepts and develop the new terms liberal market economy and coordinated market economy to distinguish neoliberalism and ordoliberalism.

Development 
The theory was developed from about 1930 to 1950 by German economists and legal scholars from the Freiburg School, such as Walter Eucken, Hans Grossmann-Doerth, and Leonhard Miksch.

Ordoliberal ideals (with modifications) drove the creation of the post-World War II German social market economy. They were especially influential on forming a firm competition law in Germany. However the social market economy was implemented in economies where corporatism was already well established, so ordoliberal ideals were not as far reaching as the theory's economic founders had intended.

Since the 1960s, ordoliberal influence on economics and jurisprudence has significantly diminished; however, many German economists define themselves as Ordoliberals through the present day, the ORDO is still published, and the Faculty of Economics at the University of Freiburg is still teaching ordoliberalism.

Implementation 

Ordoliberalism was a major influence on the economic model developed in post-war West Germany. Ordoliberalism in Germany became known as the social market economy.

His government's Minister of Economics, was a known Ordoliberal and adherent of the Freiburg School. Under , some, but not all, price controls were lifted, and taxes on small businesses and corporations were lowered. Furthermore, social security and pensions were increased to provide a social base income.

Theory 
Ordoliberal theory holds that the state must create a proper legal environment for the economy and maintain a healthy level of competition through measures that adhere to market principles. This is the foundation of its legitimacy. The concern is that, if the state does not take active measures to foster competition, firms with monopoly (or oligopoly) power will emerge, which will not only subvert the advantages offered by the market economy, but also possibly undermine good government, since strong economic power can be transformed into political power.

According to Stephen Padgett, "a central tenet of ordo-liberalism is a clearly defined division of labor in economic management, with specific responsibilities assigned to particular institutions. Monetary policy should be the responsibility of a central bank committed to monetary stability and low inflation, and insulated from political pressure by independent status. Fiscal policy—balancing tax revenue against government expenditure—is the domain of the government, whilst macro-economic policy is the preserve of employers and trade unions." The state should form an economic order instead of directing economic processes, and three negative examples ordoliberals used to back their theories were Nazism, Keynesianism, and Soviet socialism. It is also seen as a third way between collectivism and laissez-faire liberalism.

While the ordoliberal idea of a social market is similar to that of the third-way social democracy advocated by the likes of the New Labour government (especially during the premiership of Tony Blair), there are a few key differences. Whilst they both adhere to the idea of providing a moderate stance between socialism and capitalism, the ordoliberal social market model often combines private enterprise with government regulation to establish fair competition (although German network industries are known to have been deregulated), whereas advocates of the third-way social democracy model have been known to oversee multiple economic deregulations. The third way social democracy model has also foreseen a clash of ideas regarding the establishment of the welfare state, in comparison to the ordoliberal's idea of a social market model being open to the benefits of social welfare.

Ordoliberals are also known for pursuing a minimum configuration of vital resources and progressive taxation. The ordoliberal emphasis on the privatization of public services and other public firms such as telecommunication services; wealth redistribution and minimum wage laws as regulative principles makes clear the links between this economic model and the social market economy.

Wilhelm Röpke considered ordoliberalism to be "liberal conservatism", against capitalism in his work  ("A Humane Order of Society", 1944).  also criticized laissez-faire capitalism in his work  ("The Failure of Economic Liberalism", 1950). The ordoliberals thus separated themselves from classical liberals and valued the idea of social justice. "Social security and social justice", wrote , "are the greatest concerns of our time".

That is, both recognise the "irrational rationality" of the capitalist system, but not the "logic of contradiction" that Marx posited. Both groups took up the same problem, but in vastly different directions.

Criticism 

See also 
 Allocative efficiency
 Dirigisme
 Freiburg School
 Liberal conservatism
 Neoliberalism
 Radical centrism
 Social market economy

References

Further reading

External links 

, German Ordoliberal association.
, German research institute in the tradition of ordoliberalism.
, Italian Centre Studies on Social Market Economy and liberal tradition in the light of Catholic social thought.
ORDO official website
Back issues of ORDO Yearbook Vol. 1 - Vol. 65 (1948-2014) via JSTOR

Economic liberalism
Economic policy in Europe
Economy of Germany
Freiburg School
Ideologies of capitalism
Liberalism
Political ideologies